Tatarovo is a rural locality (a village) in Kubenskoye Rural Settlement, Vologodsky District, Vologda Oblast, Russia. The population was 11 as of 2002.

Geography 
Tatarovo is located 42 km northwest of Vologda (the district's administrative centre) by road. Pavlovo is the nearest rural locality.

References 

Rural localities in Vologodsky District